Raúl Alberto Morales (born 4 June 1951) is a Bolivian footballer. He played in eight matches for the Bolivia national football team from 1975 to 1977. He was also part of Bolivia's squad for the 1975 Copa América tournament.

References

External links
 
 

1951 births
Living people
Bolivian footballers
Bolivia international footballers
Club Bolívar players
The Strongest players
Footballers from La Paz
Association football forwards